Sumangali Bhava was an 2019 Indian Malayalam psychological thriller television series which premiered on 1 July 2019 on Zee Keralam channel. It stars Darshana Das and Richard NJ in lead roles. The show is the official remake of Marathi serial Tu Ashi Jawali Raha which was aired on Zee Yuva channel.

Plot 
Vaidehi, an independent girl, dreams of being married to a man who adores her. After she marries Suryanarayana Varma, she struggles to deal with her husband's obsessive love.

Cast

Main cast
 Richard Jose as Suryanarayana Varma
 Darshana Das / Sonu Satheesh Kumar as Vaidehi (Devu) / Nimisha
 Keerthana Poduwal as Karthika

Recurring cast
 Spadikam George as Col. R V Thamburan
 Balachandran Chullikkadu as Varriyar
Gayathri Varsha as Lalitha
Divya Yeshodharan as Nila
Deepan Murali as Sidharthan 
Prajusha as Meenakshi
Amith as Ramachandran
Rajeev Roshan
Lakshmi Sanal as Ramachandran's wife
Binu Dev as Vishwanthan
 Tanvi Raveendran as Varaprabha
Vijayakumari as Maheshwari Amma
Sruthy Surendran (Manve) as Mayuri
Pramod Mani as Bhadran
Jaseela Parveen
Sheela Sree 
Fawaz Zayani as Unni
Kalamandalam Radhika as Vaidehi's grandmother
Haridas as Niranjan
Ardra Das
Chandrasekhar Puthuserry
Jayakrishnan Kichu as Niranjan
Sadhika Venugopal
Sindhu Jacob
Poojappura Radhakrishnan as Vasudevan (Guest role in 1st episode) 
Ambika Mohan as Santhamma (Guest role in 1st episode)
Mersheena Neenu as Sathya (Guest role)
 Nandhan Senanipuram as assistant photographer (negative role )

Adaptations

References

Indian television soap operas
Serial drama television series
2019 Indian television series debuts
Zee Keralam original programming
Indian drama television series
Malayalam-language television shows